Shady Grove is an unincorporated community in Montgomery County, Tennessee, United States.

The community is home to the Shady Grove Free Will Baptist Church. It once had three schools, and was home to a one-room schoolhouse building until 1991, when it was relocated and renovated.

References

Unincorporated communities in Montgomery County, Tennessee
Unincorporated communities in Tennessee